Milo Sumner, ( – 21 March 1686) D.D. also known as Miles Symner, Miles Symmes or Myles Symner, was an Anglican priest and academic in Ireland in the second half of the seventeenth century.

Sumner was educated at Trinity College, Dublin, where was a scholar in 1626. He was a major in the Parliamentary Army in the Civil War. He was appointed Fellow and Professor of Mathematics by the Parliamentary Commissioners in 1652, a position which became the Donegall Lectureship. He became Archdeacon of Clogher in 1661 and then Archdeacon of Kildare from 1668.

References

17th-century Irish Anglican priests
Archdeacons of Kildare
1686 deaths
Archdeacons of Clogher
Alumni of Trinity College Dublin
Scholars of Trinity College Dublin
Fellows of Trinity College Dublin
Academics of Trinity College Dublin
Irish mathematicians